Lachlan Moorhead (born 15 May 2000)  is a British judoka. He is British champion and won gold in the Men's 81 kg at the 2022 Commonwealth Games.

Early life and education
Moorhead is from Penistone, where his father, who coached him initially, started a judo club, and where he attended Penistone Grammar School. He is a member of Sheffield Judo Club. He studies business management at the University of Birmingham.

Career
In 2019, Moorhead won bronze medals at the European Junior Championships and the Kaunas European Junior Cup. In 2021, competing as an adult, he won bronze at the Abu Dhabi Grand Slam. Also in 2021, Moorhead became a British champion after winning the half-middleweight division at the British Judo Championships.

At the 2022 Commonwealth Games, he won the gold medal in the 81 kg class, defeating Canadian François Gauthier-Drapeau in the final.

Personal life
Inspired by the death of Craig Fallon when he was 11, Moorhead is an ambassador for If U Care Share, a charity which raises awareness of male suicide and mental health issues.

References

External links
 
 

2000 births
Living people
Commonwealth Games gold medallists for England
English male judoka
21st-century British people
Commonwealth Games medallists in judo
Judoka at the 2022 Commonwealth Games
People educated at Penistone Grammar School
Medallists at the 2022 Commonwealth Games